The 1930 European Rowing Championships were rowing championships held on the Meuse in the Belgian city of Liège. The competition was for men only and they competed in all seven Olympic boat classes (M1x, M2x, M2-, M2+, M4-, M4+, M8+).

Medal summary

References

European Rowing Championships
European Rowing Championships
Rowing
Rowing
Sport in Liège